Laudal is a village in Lindesnes municipality in Agder county, Norway. The village of Laudal has 191 residents (2001). Laudal was the administrative centre of the old municipality of Laudal which existed from 1899 until its dissolution in 1964. Laudal Church is located in the small village.

Name
The municipality (originally the parish) is named after the old Laudal farm (Old Norse: Laugardalr), since that is the location of the church. The first element of the name of the farm comes from the old name for the river, Laug, (now the Lågåna river) and the last element (Old Norse: dalr) means "valley". Therefore, the name means "Laug river valley".

References

External links

Weather information for Laudal 

Lindesnes
Villages in Agder